Themneihat Haokip was an Indian Thadou-Kuki actress known for portraying Hoinu in the hit film Kum 10 Kilungset (1994). Her second film Hinkho (1995) was also a box office success. She was one of the well known actresses of Kuki films during the 1990s.

Death 
She died on 2 June 2020 due to a stroke.

Filmography

References

1978 births
2020 deaths
20th-century Indian actresses
People from Churachandpur district